"Heliotrope Bouquet" is a 1907 rag composed by Scott Joplin and Louis Chauvin. The first section of the piece is unique in ragtime for its structure, rhythm and melody. This and the second section were most likely contributed by Louis Chauvin, while the third and fourth section show Joplin’s style of composing.

See also
 List of compositions by Scott Joplin

References

External links
Musical score and recording on the International Music Score Library Project

Rags by Scott Joplin
Compositions for solo piano